is a railway station operated by the Keisei Electric Railway located in Chūō-ku, Chiba Japan. It is 4.2 kilometers from the terminus of the Keisei Chihara Line at Chiba-Chūō Station.

History
Ōmoridai Station was opened on 1 April 1992 as the initial terminal station of the Chihara Line. The line was extended to Chiharadai Station by 1 April 1995.

Station numbering was introduced to all Keisei Line stations on 17 July 2010; Ōmoridai Station was assigned station number KS62.

Lines
Keisei Electric Railway
Keisei Chihara Line

Layout
Ōmoridai Station is an underground railway station with two opposed side platforms.

Platforms

External links
  Keisei Station layout

References

Railway stations in Japan opened in 1992
Railway stations in Chiba Prefecture